SB-258719 is a drug developed by GlaxoSmithKline which acts as a selective 5-HT7 receptor partial inverse agonist, and was the first such ligand identified for 5-HT7. Its use in research has mainly been in demonstrating the potential use for 5-HT7 agonists as potential novel analgesics, due to the ability of SB-258719 to block the analgesic effects of a variety of 5-HT7 agonists across several different testing models.

References 

5-HT7 antagonists
Piperidines
Sulfonamides